High Forest may refer to:
High Forest (Forgotten Realms), a fictional region in the Forgotten Realms campaign setting
High forest, an ecological and woodland management term for woodland with a range of tree sizes from saplings to ancient trees
High Forest Township, Olmsted County, Minnesota